The Cedula of Population was a 1783 edict by the representative of the King of Spain,
José de Gálvez, opening Trinidad to immigration from, primarily, the French Caribbean islands. Negotiated by Phillipe Rose Roume de Saint-Laurent, a key figure in Trinidad's colonial history, the edict consists of 28 articles governing several forms of land grants to encourage population growth, naturalization of inhabitants, taxation, armament of slave owners, the duty and function of a militia to protect the island, and merchant and trade issues.

History

The edict of 1783 invited persons of either gender and of the Roman Catholic faith to Trinidad who would swear loyalty to the Spanish Crown to receive land allotments in sizes depending on their race and heritage. Specifically, it granted  of land to each Roman Catholic who settled in Trinidad and half as much for each slave that they brought. 16 acres (65,000 m²) was offered to each free person of color, or gens de couleur libre, as they were later known, and half as much for each slave they placed on Trinidad The effect of the cedula was immediate, as what had once been a small colony of 1000 in 1773 had boomed to 18,627 inhabitants by 1797. The Cedula of Population of 1783 laid the foundation and growth of the population of Trinidad.

The Spanish who were in possession of the island, contributed little towards  advancements, with El Dorado the focus, Trinidad was perfect due to its geographical location. French planters with their slaves, free persons of color and mulattos from neighbouring islands of Grenada, Martinique, Guadeloupe and Dominica migrated to Trinidad during the French Revolution. The Spanish also gave many incentives to lure settlers to the island, including exemption from taxes for ten years and land grants in accordance to the terms set out in the Cedula. These new immigrants establishing local communities of Blanchisseuse, Champs Fleurs, Cascade, Carenage and Laventille. Trinidad's population jumped from just under 1,400 in 1777, to over 15,000 by the end of 1789.

Upon the capture of Trinidad by the British in 1797, the Cedula of Population became a paramount document that established the legal status of the free persons of color in Trinidad in the declaration of capitulation. In particular, it protected their "liberty, persons and property like other inhabitants." in the British crown colony.

References

1783 documents
Spanish period of Trinidad and Tobago
Trinidad (island)
1783 in New Spain
1780s in the Spanish West Indies
18th century in Trinidad and Tobago
1783 in law
Settlement schemes in Central America and the Caribbean
Edicts